The Stevington and Turvey Light Railway was a  narrow gauge light railway on the outskirts of the village of Turvey in Bedfordshire, England. The railway was formed in the early 1980s by former members of The Surrey Light Railway which was based in Hersham, Surrey. The railway was established on the former track bed of the Bedford to Northampton Line. The main signal box on the line was named Needham, and contains a 31 lever Westinghouse 'L' frame which originally came from Battersea Park Signal box.

The line closed in 2014, with the operations moving to Woburn.

References 

2 ft gauge railways in England
Rail transport in Bedfordshire